Prospect House (also known as the Lingan-Templeman House) is a historic building, located at 3508 Prospect Street, Northwest, Washington, D.C., in the Georgetown neighborhood.

History
It was built in 1788, by James Lingan, designed by William Thornton, architect of the United States Capitol. President John Adams visited the residence and Gilbert du Motier, marquis de Lafayette was a house guest. It was a guest house, while Blair House was under renovation.
Notable previous owners include Secretary of Defense James Forrestal. In 1951, Congressman Richard Thurmond Chatham and his wife Patricia Firestone Coyner purchased and remodeled Prospect House.
In June 1977, the property was purchased by David and Carol Ann Shapiro.

Prospect House is listed on the National Register of Historic Places, and is a contributing property to the Georgetown Historic District.
Its 2009 property value is $5,016,210. The house is directly adjacent to the Georgetown Car Barn.

References

External links
 

Houses on the National Register of Historic Places in Washington, D.C.
Individually listed contributing properties to historic districts on the National Register in Washington, D.C.
William Thornton buildings
Houses completed in 1788
Georgetown (Washington, D.C.)